Tuo Jiaxi (born 15 January 1991) is a Chinese professional Go player.

Tuo became a professional in 2002. He was promoted to 2 dan in 2004 and reached 3 dan in 2005. He won his first professional title with the Mind Sports Games Male Fast Game in 2009. He won the Chang-ki Cup in 2010.

Tuo was a part of the Chinese team that participated in the 10th Nongshim Cup. He defeated Heo Yeongho, Yamashita Keigo, Yun Junsang, and Kono Rin before losing to Kang Dongyun. China eventually lost when their final player, Gu Li, lost to Lee Sedol.

Promotion record

Career record
2007: 41 wins, 25 losses
2008: 32 wins, 21 losses
2009: 38 wins, 18 losses
2010: 56 wins, 24 losses

Titles and runners-up

References

1991 births
Living people
Chinese Go players